Andrew Drummond is a Scottish writer, translator and novelist.  He was born in Edinburgh and studied at the University of Aberdeen and the University of London.  Previously employed full-time as a software engineer, he now pursues his writing full-time.

He is the author of five novels: An Abridged History of the Construction of a Railway Line Between Ullapool and Lochinver (2004); A Hand-book of Volapük (2006) set in 1890s Scotland; Elephantina (2008); Novgorod the Great (2010); and The Books of the Incarceration of the Lady Grange (2016). He has also written several short stories and some nonfiction translations from German.
More recently, he has written a biography of the 18th century adventurer Maurice Benyovszky, entitled The Intriguing Life and Ignominious Death of Maurice Benyovszky (2017), and an account of the attempts to extend rail connections to the north-west Highlands of Scotland, A Quite Impossible Proposal: How Not to Build a Railway (2020).

References

Bibliography

Books 
 2004. An Abridged History. Edinburgh: Polygon.
 2006. A Hand-book of Volapük. Edinburgh: Polygon.
 2008. Elephantina. Edinburgh: Polygon.
 2010. Novgorod the Great. Edinburgh: Polygon.
 2016. The Books of the Incarceration of the Lady Grange. Edinburgh.
 2017. The Intriguing Life and Ignominious Death of Maurice Benyovszky.  New York/London: Routledge.
 2020. A Quite Impossible Proposal – How Not to Build a Railway.  Edinburgh: Birlinn.

Short Stories 
 2002. A Chronicle of the World 1840–1893. In: Writing Wrongs. Edinburgh: Canongate.
 2012. Dr Calvin's Grand Illuminated Bestial Pleasure Dome In: Unfit for Eden, Postcripts Anthology 26/27.  Hornsea: PS Publishing.
 2013. The Providential Preservation of the Universal Bibliographic Repository. In: Memoryville Blues, Postcripts Anthology 30/31. Hornsea: PS Publishing.
 2014. One Hundred Thousand Demons and the Cherub of Desire. In: Far Voyager, Postcripts Anthology 32/33. Hornsea: PS Publishing.

Translations (from German) 
 1983. Letters on Capital. London: New Park.
 1991. And Red is the Colour of Our Flag. London: New Park.
 1992. Trotsky and the Russian Social-Democratic Controversy over comparative revolutionary history. In: The Trotsky Reappraisal, Brotherstone e Dukes (red.). Edinburgh: Edinburgh University Press.

External links
Author's web site
2004 Interview focusing on An Abridged History
2006 Interview focusing on A Hand-Book of Volapük
Review of A Hand-Book of Volapük  by Peter Burnett
Review of A Hand-Book of Volapük by Jim Henry

Scottish translators
German–English translators
Scottish novelists
Alumni of the University of Aberdeen
Writers from Edinburgh
Year of birth missing (living people)
Living people
Volapük